{{DISPLAYTITLE:C21H24N2O3}}
The molecular formula C21H24N2O3 may refer to:

 Ajmalicine
 16-Hydroxytabersonine
 Lochnericine
 Preakuammicine
 Raucaffrinoline
 Vobasine

Molecular formulas